Emma Goldman: The Anarchist Guest is a documentary about Emma Goldman that was released in 2000. It was directed by Canadian sociologist and filmmaker Coleman Romalis. The film was screened at the 2000 San Francisco Jewish Film Festival.

References

External links
Emmarabilia: Books and Reference Items 

English-language Canadian films
2000 films
Documentary films about anarchism
Documentary films about Jews and Judaism in the United States
Documentary films about feminism
Works about Emma Goldman
History of anarchism
Canadian documentary films
2000 documentary films
Films about activists
2000s Canadian films